The FanMail Tour is the debut headlining tour by American group TLC. The tour support their third studio album, FanMail. The tour visited North America with dates later planned for Japan and Europe. However, the international dates after the second North American leg were cancelled.

Background
Most dates of the tour were sold out and the group would perform all the hits from throughout their career. The tightly choreographed concert featured a five-piece band, seven dancers, cybertechnics, and a giant-screen android named "Virtual Vic-E". On September 27, 1999, TLC donated an exclusive track entitled "I Need That" to MP3.com, that the fans could download from the company's website for free. In exchange, MP3.com sponsored the tour and donated ten cents to the Sickle Cell Disease Association each time the song was downloaded.

At the time, TLC had to address the incessant rumors that they were breaking up. Lisa Lopes told the New York Daily News, "A lot of people are under the impression that I'm leaving the group. That's not the case..." She also added, "The magic of the group has everything to do with the chemistry between myself, Tionne [Watkins] and Chilli [Rozonda Thomas]...with TLC, it's like, if there wasn't something going wrong, it just wouldn't be right." The tour wrapped up in their hometown of Atlanta, a day prior to Super Bowl XXXIV. Mayor Bill Campbell gave the group a key to the city and declared January 29, "TLC Day". On March 18, 2000, the group had a PayPerView special of the full live show in Atlanta, called TLC: Sold Out.

Shortly after the Atlanta show, all three members were offered $25 million to extend the tour into Europe and Japan, but backed out of it when Lopes instead requested time off to visit Honduras and to work on her debut solo album, Supernova. Even though Watkins and Thomas were unhappy with her decision, they reluctantly agreed to pass on the extension.

A few performances from their concert at MCI Center, Washington, D.C. on January 23, 2000 have later been included on their Japanese compilation TLC 20: 20th Anniversary Hits (2013).

Concert synopsis
The show was divided into five acts plus an encore. It began with a futuristic theme and an introduction by the giant screen android, "Virtual Vic-E", welcoming the audience to the show. After the video ends, all 3 members rise from the stage, each in different silver clothing to perform "FanMail" as well as "Silly Ho" and "If They Knew". The backup dancers wore purple raincoats and pants. The first leg of the tour featured the girls wearing butterfly-themed outfits, but they were quickly replaced with the silver outfits for unknown reasons. After the end of "If They Knew", Lopes revealed a bag of mail received from fans in the city, and promised that she and the other members would read through it later in the show.

The show continued with the Ooooooohhh... On the TLC Tip era, in which the members performed "Ain't 2 Proud 2 Beg", "What About Your Friends" and "Baby-Baby-Baby", dressed in white overalls surrounded with multi-colored spray paint in homage to their early image. Lopes also wore large pink sunglasses and a pacifier around her neck.

Shortly before the beginning of the CrazySexyCool era, Vic-E detected an intruder backstage. The intruder, a man in a black hooded costume, revealed himself as an evil villain. He spotted the bag of fanmail and proceeded to steal it, leaving the band and the backup dancers too later to stop him. However, they barely had any time to mull it over, when TLC returned to perform "Creep" shortly after, unaware of the theft, with Lopes, Watkins and Thomas wearing silk pajamas, very similar to the ones they wore in the "Creep" music video. The backup dancers also wore pajamas. Lopes and Thomas each had their own platform on both ends of the stage, while Watkins was in the middle of the main stage. All girls were eventually on the main stage to perform Lopes' rap. Right after the song, "Red Light Special" followed, which again featured Lopes and Thomas on their separate platforms, but instead sitting on a chair and Watkins on the main stage. Several female dancers also sat on chairs, dancing seductively.

The solos of each member followed shortly after the dance interlude of "Housequake", starting with Left Eye, performing an unreleased rap entitled "Crazy". She also did several magic tricks and played the keyboard. Then followed Chilli's solo, dressed as a cowgirl to perform "Come on Down". She was also accompanied by several female dancers also dressed as cowgirls. After the song, she was then lowered down the main stage. She re-emerged wearing a new costume which she, along with the rest of the members, then wore until the end of the concert. She would then pick a man from the audience and begin to perform "I Miss You So Much" with the man sitting on a chair and Chilli singing to him. T-Boz was last to perform her solo, appearing on stage dressed in a purple suit with a wooden cane to sing the first lines of the famous military march chant, "I Don't Know (But I Been Told)". She would then remove her suit to reveal a costume similar to Chilli's during the performance of "I Miss You So Much", to sing "If I Was Your Girlfriend", "Touch Myself" and" Dear Lie".

After the girls' solos was Act 4, entitled Rain. "Unpretty" was the first song of the act, which featured many children from the audience who came up to sing with them. "I'm Good at Being Bad", "My Life" and a salsa version of "Shout" were performed after.

Act 5 commenced with Lopes finally noticing the missing bag of fanmail, and the group were informed by the band and the audience that the evil villain took it. Disappointed, the girls would turn to Vic-E, who would explain that the letters would not reveal the full strength of the bond between TLC and the fans, and assure the audience that TLC loves them. The girls then performed their signature song, "Waterfalls". The giant screen showed clips from the music video and water running. Backup dancers wore different colored shirts.

During the last show of the tour in Atlanta, Goodie Mob made a special appearance to perform their song with TLC, "What It Ain't (Ghetto Enuff)". "No Scrubs" was the final song of the show, which had Watkins and Lopes on the end platforms of the stage and Thomas on the main stage, with a dancer trying to give his number to her. They would all eventually end up back on the main stage together to perform Left Eye's rap on the song. Just as the song was ending, the bag of fanmail returned. There was a note attached to it from the evil villain, apologising for the theft, and explaining that he had written to them hundreds of times and they never wrote back. He reveals that he bought some T-shirts as an apology gift and placed them in the bag. The girls proceeded to hand out the T-shirts to the audience and to thank the crowd. All backup dancers then joined hands with Lopes, Watkins and Thomas to end the show.

Critical reception
The tour received very positive reviews from critics. Natalie Nichols of the Los Angeles Times described the Anaheim show as: "...a thoroughly 21st century pop concert, with all the razzle-dazzle and sense of fun you'd expect [...] TLC delighted fans while underscoring the staying power that has made it the best-selling female trio in history [...] a seven-piece band managed to stay out of the way, playing TLC's blend of soul, hip-hop, funk and pop with surprising verve...However, this was one modern multi-platinum act that had plenty of meat to match the sizzle".

Darryl Morden of The Hollywood Reporter described the New York City show as "smart, sexy, stylish, sweet, daring, dazzling and diverse, the 100-minute performance Friday night was full of flash but grounded in personal charisma. Effects and gimmickry took a back seat to old-fashioned, engaging showmanship".

Variety's Troy Augusto described it as "an exciting evening of singing and dancing that delivered all of their hit songs in charming fashion".

Gene Stout of the Seattle Post-Intelligencer added, "Pent-up demand for the Atlanta-based trio's incendiary blend of pop, hip-hop and R&B made the evening a celebration."

However, Craig Seymour of Entertainment Weekly states, "...there were occasional signs of the strife that has divided Lisa "Left Eye" Lopes from her band mates Rozonda 'Chilli' Thomas and Tionne 'T-Boz' Watkins. At various points during the show, Chilli and T-Boz high-fived each other while ignoring Left Eye. Left Eye, in turn, strutted past the other two as if they were merely set pieces to avoid. Things heated up during a particularly aggressive rendition of 'What About Your Friends' when T-Boz appeared to glare at Left Eye while singing the lyrics, What about your friends/Will they let you down/Will they be around?".

Opening Acts
Ricky J (North America, 1999, 1st Leg)
Jodie Resther (North America, 1999, 1st Leg)
Destiny's Child (North America, 1999, 1st Leg)
K-Ci & JoJo (North America, 1999, 1st Leg)
Ideal (North America, 1999, 1st Leg)
Marc Nelson (North America, 1999, 1st Leg)
Blaque (North America, 2000, 2nd Leg)
Christina Aguilera (North America, 2000, 2nd Leg)

Set list

Act I: The Future
"Vic-E"  (intro)
"FanMail"  (includes "The Vic-E Interpretation Interlude") 
"Silly Ho"
"If They Knew"
Act II: Back to the TLC Tip
"Ooooooohhh... On the TLC Tip" (interlude)
"Ain't 2 Proud 2 Beg"
"What About Your Friends"
"Baby-Baby-Baby"
Act III: CrazySexyCool
"The Villain"  (interlude) 
"Creep"  (Remix) 
"Red Light Special"  (includes "Housequake" interpretation) 
"Crazy" (Left Eye solo)
"Sexy" (interlude)
"Come on Down" (Chilli solo)
"I Miss You So Much" (Chilli solo)
"Cool" (interlude)
"Touch Myself"  (includes elements of "Back That Azz Up" & "Nasty Girl")  (T-Boz solo)
"If I Was Your Girlfriend" (T-Boz solo)
"Dear Lie" (T-Boz solo)
Act IV: Rain
"Unpretty"
"I'm Good at Being Bad"
"My Life"
"Shout" (Remix)
"Waterfalls"

Encore
"No Scrubs"

Tour dates

Cancellations and rescheduled shows

Personnel
Band
Dallas Austin – keyboards
Thomas Martin – guitars
Thomas Knight – drums, percussion
Ethan Farmer – bass
Eric Daniels – keyboards, musical director
Christopher Rupert – drums, percussion

Choreographer
Devyne Stephens

Dancers
Oththan Burnside
Jamaica Craft
Ray Johnson
Aakomon Jones
Shannon Lopez
Dean Pagtakhan
Kevin White

Production manager
Jason Scianno
Tanya Greenblatt

Wardrobe and stylist
Julieanne Mijares 
Laurie Chang (assistant stylist)

Tour production manager
Dale "Opie" Skjerseth

Stage designer
Lisa "Left Eye" Lopes

References

1999 concert tours
2000 concert tours
TLC (group) concert tours